Cloonacauneen Castle is a restored 15th-century tower house with an attached wing. It is privately-owned, and is located in the northeast outskirts of Galway city in County Galway, Ireland.

History 

The castle was built in the 15th century. By 1914, it had fallen into disrepair. In 1963, a restoration effort was started by the Lenihan family, which saw the roofs of the castle and guest house replaced and the battlements raised back to their original height.

Unusually, the castle's owners have been recorded since as early as 1574, when it was owned by Richard Beag Burke.

Modern usage 

The castle nowadays primarily functions as a restaurant and pub, tourist destination, and hotel. It is commonly used for events such as weddings and corporate functions.

References 

Castles in County Galway
National Monuments in County Galway
Tower houses in the Republic of Ireland